Brian Roy Goble, (January 4, 1957 – December 7, 2014), also known as Wimpy Roy or Brian "Sunny Boy Roy" Goble, was a Canadian singer and musician. He played bass and sang for several Vancouver punk bands. After starting with Stone Crazy, Brian then began playing punk rock, playing bass with The Skulls, before becoming lead singer for The Subhumans when The Skulls split. After the demise of Subhumans, Brian joined D.O.A. in the early 1980s as bass player and second singer.  After playing and singing on a number of D.O.A. albums, he quit in 1996 after the Black Spot tour. He would later reunite with The Subhumans in 2006.

Goble died of a heart attack on December 7, 2014, aged 57.

References

1957 births
2014 deaths
Anarcho-punk musicians
Canadian punk rock singers
Canadian punk rock bass guitarists
20th-century Canadian male singers
20th-century Canadian guitarists
D.O.A. (band) members
Subhumans (Canadian band) members
The Skulls (Canadian band) members